Pratapnagar railway station (station code: PRTN) is a railway station in Vadodara city of Gujarat state.

Pratapnagar Workshop

Pratapnagar railway station has a workshop for maintaining coaches and carriage wagons. The foundation stone of Pratapnagar workshop was laid by His Highness Lord Chelmsford and Viceroy of India in 1919. Pratapnagar workshop was started in 1922.

Trains

Following trains start from Pratapnagar railway station:

 59117/18 Pratapnagar–Chhota Udaipur Passenger
 59119/20 Pratapnagar–Chhota Udaipur Passenger
 59121/22 Pratapnagar–Alirajpur Passenger
 79455/56 Vadodara–Chhota Udaipur DEMU

See also
 Vadodara Junction railway station
 Dabhoi Junction railway station
 Chhota Udaipur railway station
 Bodeli railway station
 Ekta Nagar railway station

References

Railway stations in Vadodara district
Vadodara railway division